Mohammad Ayub Dogar (born 13 September 1979) is a Pakistani former cricketer who played for Pakistan national cricket team.

He has represented Punjab and the Sialkot Stallions. He has selected for Test series against Sri Lanka in 2012 season.

References

External links

1979 births
People from Nankana Sahib District
Living people
Pakistani cricketers
Sheikhupura cricketers
Sialkot cricketers
Sui Northern Gas Pipelines Limited cricketers
Water and Power Development Authority cricketers
Sialkot Stallions cricketers
Punjab (Pakistan) cricketers
Pakistan Test cricketers